The Magellan Seamounts (also known as Magellan Seamount Group and previously called Magellan Rise ) stretch from the Mariana Trench to Ita Mai Tai Guyot. Geological studies have demonstrated unique features with implications on understanding of ocean island basalt volcanism. Contracts exist with the International Seabed Authority to exploit the areas potential mineral wealth.

Geography 
  
They include:
 Govorov Guyot

121 ± 2.8 to 98.5 ± 1.4 Ma
 Ioah Seamount (also known as Ioah Guyot, Ioan Seamount or Fedorov Seamount)

 87 millon years old
 Pako Guyot

 92 millon years old but volcanics have been now dated in range 112 to 86 Ma  and < 20 Ma in smaller volcanoes on the guyot.
 Vlinder Guyot (also known as Alba Guyot)

 95 millon years old
 Ita Mai Tai Guyot 

 118 millon years old

Geology
The volcanoes are part of a hotspot chain whose formation ages are in the range 121 to 86 million years ago. However recently sampling has shown secondary volcanic activity at about 20 million years ago. Pako Guyot, which is quite large, is to date the only ocean island basalt seamount where two quite distinct mantle plume components have been discovered in one seamount, being an extreme high μ = 238U/204Pb mantle (HIMU) and enriched mantle 1 (EM1) component. These are respectively suggestive of associations with the Arago hotspot and the Rarotonga hotspot.
Given their age the guyots have also had sedimentary deposits which have been characterised as reef and planktonic limestones. They are of interest for their mineral potential, for example with cobalt containing ferromanganese nodule deposits.

See also
 Geology of the Pacific Ocean

References 

Seamount chains
Guyots
Hotspot tracks
Seamounts of the Pacific Ocean
Cretaceous volcanoes